1892 was the third season of County Championship cricket in England. Surrey set a record number of wins with thirteen of their sixteen matches to retain the title. George Lohmann and Bill Lockwood took over 100 wickets each in the 16 Championship matches.

Honours
County Championship – Surrey
Wisden (Five Batsmen of the Year) – Herbie Hewett, Lionel Palairet, Walter Read, Stanley Scott, Andrew Stoddart

County Championship

Final table 

Points system:

 1 for a win
 0 for a draw
 -1 for a loss

Most runs in the County Championship

Most wickets in the County Championship

Overall first-class statistics

Leading batsmen

Leading bowlers

References

Annual reviews
 James Lillywhite's Cricketers' Annual (Red Lilly), Lillywhite, 1893
 Wisden Cricketers' Almanack 1893

External links
 Cricket in England in 1892

1892 in English cricket
1892